Carlo di Cosimo de' Medici (1428  or  1430 – May 29, 1492) was an Italian priest. A member of the powerful Medici family, he became a senior clergyman and collector.

Early life
Born in Florence, he was the illegitimate son of Cosimo de' Medici (the Elder) and a slave-woman named Maddalena, who was said to have been purchased in Venice. It is widely accepted that Maddalena was a Circassian, as hinted by Carlo's "intense blue eyes" and other "marked Circassian features" as well. However, it has been once suggested that his mother might have been a black African, only because of the apparently dusky features depicted in Mantegna's portrait of Carlo.

Career
His father forced him to take on a religious life. After becoming canon of the cathedral at Florence in 1450, he was appointed rector of Pieve di Santa Maria (Dicomano) in Mugello and the Pieve of San Donato di Calenzano.

He became Abbot of San Salvatore at Vaiano, outside Prato. He was also Papal tax collector and nuncio in Tuscany. Carlo was dean of Prato as early as 1460. A cultured man, he collected medallions. He died in Florence in 1492.

Portrayals

Carlo was portrayed by Andrea Mantegna in a head-and-shoulders portrait wearing the clerical garb of a protonotary apostolic in 1466. He also appears in the funeral scene of Filippo Lippi's Stories of St. Stephen and St. John the Baptist in the Prato Cathedral, in which he is depicted standing behind the Pope. He may also be portrayed as one of the figures in Benozzo Gozzoli's paintings of the journey of the Magi in the Magi Chapel in Florence.

In the historical fantasy series Da Vinci's Demons, Carlo was played by actor Ray Fearon. He is depicted as a missionary whom the cruelty of the world has made doubt the Church and its message.

He appears in seasons two and three of Medici, played by Callum Blake. His mother is played by Sarah Felberbaum in the first season.

Notes

References

External links
Online Archive of Medici Family Documents

1420s births
1492 deaths
Carlo
Nobility from Florence
Italian people of Circassian descent
Italian abbots
15th-century Italian Roman Catholic priests
Clergy from Florence